This is a list of episodes from the Atomic Cartoons and Tele Images Kids animated television series Atomic Betty.   In North America, the show airs in a half-hour format comprising two mini episodes. Many areas outside of North America use a 15-minute format of only one mini episode. The second season premiere and finale are both two-part, half-hour episodes. The show ended in Canada on January 29, 2008 with the two-part series finale, "The Future Is Now!" (later aired in North America on January 6, 2011).

Series overview

Episodes

Season 1 (2004–05) 
The order and pairing of some episodes in season one differed between Canada and the rest of the world where the show was broadcast, including the United States. Below are the order and cartoon pairing as they were aired in these areas, except Japan where Cartoon Network reshuffled the United States orders. Subsequent seasons were identical in both Canada and the United States.

Season 2 (2005–06) 
 Len Carlson, the original voice of Minimus P.U., Spindly Tam Kanushu, B-1, among others, was replaced about halfway through the third and final season by Dwayne Hill, who became the different voice of Minimus and Spindly Tam, similar to Atomic Roger. Carlson passed away on January 26, 2006, and the two-part episode "Takes One to Know One" was dedicated to him.
Beatrixo Barrett's secret identity as a former, retired Galactic Guardian is confirmed here.

Season 3: Mission: Earth (2007–08) 
The third and final season entitled Atomic Betty: Mission Earth begins by resolving the cliffhanger ending from the previous season.  For this season, a new series opening and theme song was given.
This is the last where Minimus P.U. and Spindly Tam Kanushu are both voiced by Dwayne Hill from beginning to end. 
A sequel series, consisting of the seventeen-year-old Atomic Betty from the two-part series finale, was planned to air in 2013, but was never made.

Ending sketches
In addition to the two short episodes, each episode ends with a short sketch.  Regular sketches include:
Crash Test Noah – Noah is put into testing the latest Galactic Guardian equipment by X-5, which inevitably goes wrong.
Sparky and Minimus: Moose Jaw Undercover – Sparky and Minimus pose as undercover police officers in a tribute to Starsky and Hutch.
Sparky vs. Minimus – Sparky and Minimus compete to see who is better at a particular task.
The DeGill Show – Admiral DeGill is the host of a late-night talk show series.  The sketch is a tribute to the Late Show with David Letterman.

See also 
 Atomic Betty

External links 
 TV Guide's Atomic Betty Episode list
 TV.com's Atomic Betty Episode Guide

References

Lists of Canadian children's animated television series episodes
Lists of French animated television series episodes
Atomic Betty